Olho de sogra (‘mother-in-law's eye‘ in Portuguese) is a Brazilian candy, consisting of a beijinho candy inside a dried plum (though some recipes include egg yolk). The final mix is rolled over crystal sugar. The name comes from the shape of the candy, which resembles an eye.

See also
 List of Brazilian sweets and desserts

Brazilian confectionery
Brazilian cuisine
Foods containing coconut
Plum dishes